Sillage in perfume refers to the trail created by a perfume when it is worn on the skin. It comes from the word in French for "wake" and can best be described as how a fragrance diffuses behind the wearer as they move. A fragrance does not need to be a heavy one to have a large sillage.

Sillage in a perfume is not to be confused with its 'projection' (how a fragrance is perceived by others around the wearer) and is enhanced by motion, ambient temperature as well as the inherent qualities of the skin. According to an article by Mookerjee, a fragrance is perceived by the diffusion of individual fragrance molecules. The rate of diffusion of these molecules in a fragrance, however, appears to be independent of their molecular weights, boiling points, odour thresholds and odour value.

Once a fragrance is applied to the skin, the skin itself becomes a substrate to the scent. The inherent scent of the individual skin, moisturisation of the skin, the behaviour of the microbiome of the skin, and the temperature of the surface of the skin that the fragrance is applied to will affect the sillage or diffusion of a perfume applied to it.

Enhancing Diffusion 

Compounds such as Hedione (methyl dihydrojasmonate), damascones, Iso-E super (Tetramethyl acetyloctahydronaphthalenes), linalool and some of the synthetic musks such as cashmeran may also be added to fragrances to enhance their diffusion and sillage.

Hedione 

Hedione is a synthetic relative of methyl jasmonate,  a naturally occurring compound in floral scents such as jasmine, tuberose and magnolia. Methyl jasmonate is also found in many other plant parts and is considered to be a signalling molecule. It is considered one of the compounds responsible for the projection of the scent in living flowers and was first fully characterised between 1957 and 1962 in jasmine absolute (0.8%) by the fragrance chemist Edouard Demole who was working at Firmenich.

The first commercially successful fragrance to utilise Hedione was Eau Sauvage by perfumer Edmond Roudnitska for Christian Dior, launched in 1966. The addition of Hedione to a classically hesperidic fragrance construction created a dewy lemony magnolia-jasmine dimension without being directly floral, and gave it a new type of projection and transparency not experienced before in this type of perfume.  This is considered to be the beginning of a new trend in perfumery towards transparency and projection.

References 

Perfumery